The 2009 European Pairs Speedway Championship was the sixth edition of the UEM European Pairs Speedway Championship. The Final was held on 26 September 2009 in Miskolc, Hungary; it was second Final in Hungary, but first in Miskolc. The championship was won by Czech Republic pair and they beat Russia and the defending Champions Poland.

Results 

In the Final will be the defending Champion Poland, Czech Republic (2nd place in 2008 Final), Russia (3rd place), host team Hungary (4th place) and Latvia (5th place). A last finalist will be determined in one Semi-Final. In Ljubljana, Slovenia on May 13 will be Austria (6th place), Germany (7th place), Ukraine, Finland, host team Slovenia, Italy and Croatia.

Semi-final 

 23 May 2009 (16:20)
  Ljubljana, Stadion Ilirija (Length: 398 m)
 Referee:  Andrei Savin
 Jury President: None

Final 

 26 September 2009 (15:00)
  Miskolc, Speedway Arena Miskolc (Length: 367 m)
 Referee:  Frank Ziegler
 Jury President:  Andrzej Grodzki

See also 
 motorcycle speedway
 2009 Individual Speedway European Championship

References 

2009
European Pairs